Bob Lutz and Stan Smith defeated John Alexander and Phil Dent 6–3, 8–6, 6–3 in the final to win the men's doubles title at the 1970 Australian Open.

Seeds
All seeds receive a bye into the second round.

  John Newcombe /  Nikola Pilić (quarterfinals)
  Bob Lutz /  Stan Smith (champions)
  Arthur Ashe /  Dennis Ralston (second round)
  Dick Crealy /  Allan Stone (semifinals)
  Tom Okker /  Roger Taylor (second round)
  Mal Anderson /  Tony Roche (second round)
  William Bowrey /  Ray Ruffels (second round)
  John Alexander /  Phil Dent (final)

Draw

Finals

Section 1

Section 2

External links
 1970 Australian Open – Men's draws and results at the International Tennis Federation

Men's Doubles
Australian Open (tennis) by year – Men's doubles